Kodagu district (also known by its former name Coorg) is an administrative district in the Karnataka state of India. Before 1956, it was an administratively separate Coorg State, at which point it was merged into an enlarged Mysore State.

In 2001 its population was 548,561, 13.74% of which resided in the district's urban centre, making it the least populous of the 31 districts in Karnataka.

The nearest airports are Kannur International Airport in Kerala ( from Madikeri) and Mangalore International Airport ( from Madikeri).

Geography
Kodagu is located on the eastern slopes of the Western Ghats. The district is bordered by Dakshina Kannada district to the northwest, Hassan district to the north, Mysore district to the east, Kasaragod district of Kerala in west and Kannur district of Kerala to the southwest, and Wayanad district of Kerala to the south. The main river in Kodagu is the Kaveri (Cauvery), which originates at Talakaveri, located on the eastern side of the Western Ghats, and with its tributaries, drains the greater part of Kodagu.

Rivers (Mouth)
 Kaveri (Bay of Bengal)
 Payaswini (Arabian Sea)
 Tejaswini (Arabian Sea)
 Kuppam River (Arabian Sea)
 Valapattanam River (Arabian Sea)
 Harangi (Kaveri)
 Lakshmana Tirtha (Kaveri)
 Barapole (Valapattanam River)
 Kumaradhara (Netravathi River)

Peaks
 Tadiyandamol
 Kumara Parvatha
 Brahmagiri
 Kote Betta
 Kabbe Hill
 Mandalpatti
 Nishane Motte
 Malethirike

Administrative divisions

Taluks
The district is divided into five administrative taluks:
 Madikeri
 Virajpet
 Somwarpet
 Ponnampet
 Kushalnagar

Representation
Two members of the legislative assembly are elected from Kodagu to the Karnataka Legislative Assembly, one each from the Madikeri and Virajpet. M P Appachu Ranjan represents the Madikeri constituency while K. G. Bopaiah represents the Virajpet constituency; they are from the Bharatiya Janata Party. Kodagu, formerly part of the Kodagu-Dakshina Kannada (Mangalore) constituency, is now part of the Mysore Lok Sabha parliamentary constituency. The current MP for this constituency is Shri Pratap Simha, from the Bharatiya Janata Party.

The Codava National Council and Kodava Rashtriya Samiti are campaigning for autonomy to Kodagu district.

History

The Kodavas were the earliest inhabitants and agriculturists in Kodagu, having lived there for centuries. Kodavas Being a warrior community as well, they carried arms during times of war and had their own chieftains.

The earliest mention about Coorg can be seen in the works those date back to Sangam period (300 BCE - 300 CE). The Ezhimala dynasty had jurisdiction over two Nadus - The coastal Poozhinadu and the hilly eastern Karkanadu. According to the works of Sangam literature, Poozhinadu consisted much of the coastal belt between Mangalore and Kozhikode. Karkanadu consisted of Wayanad-Gudalur hilly region with parts of Kodagu (Coorg).

The Haleri dynasty, an offshoot of the Keladi Nayakas, ruled Kodagu between 1600 and 1834. Later the British ruled Kodagu from 1834, after the Coorg War, until India's independence in 1947. A separate state (called Coorg State) until then, in 1956 Kodagu was merged with the Mysore State (now Karnataka).

Coorg in British India
In 1834, the East India Company annexed Kodagu into British India, after deposing Chikka Virarajendra of the Kodagu kingdom, as 'Coorg'. British rule led to the establishment of educational institutions, introduction of scientific coffee cultivation, better administration and improvement of the economy.

Demographics

According to the 2011 census of India, Kodagu has a population of 554,519, roughly equal to the Solomon Islands or the US state of Wyoming. This ranks it 539 out of 640 districts in India in terms of population. Its population growth rate over the decade 2001–2011 was 1.13%. Kodagu has a sex ratio of 1019 females for every 1000 males, and a literacy rate of 82.52%. Scheduled Castes and Scheduled Tribes make up 13.27% and 10.47% of the population respectively.

Language

At the time of the 2011 census, 30.91% of the population spoke Kannada, 20.83% Malayalam, 14.86% Kodava, 8.92% Tulu, 5.81% Are, 4.66% Yerava, 4.23% Tamil, 2.95% Urdu, 1.74% Kurumba, 1.55% Telugu and 1.16% Konkani as their first language.

Are Bhashe, a dialect of Kannada and Kodava language are native to Kodagu district. Kodava Language uses the Official Script Invented by Dr IM Muthanna in 1970.

Kodava tribe and other Kodava language speakers

According to Karnataka Kodava Sahitya Academy (Karnataka's Kodava Literary Academy), apart from Kodavas, and their related groups, the Amma Kodavas, the Kodava Peggade (Kodagu Heggade) and the Kodava Maaple (Kodava Muslims), 18 other smaller-numbered ethnic groups speak Kodava Takk in and outside the district including the Iri (Airi, or the carpenters and the village smiths), the Koyava, the Banna, the Kodagu Madivala (washermen), the Kodagu Hajama (barber, also called Nainda), the Kembatti Poleya (household servants and labourers) and the Meda (basket and mat weavers and drummers).

Among other Kodava speaking communities are: the Heggades, cultivators from shimogga; the Kodava Nair, cultivators from Malabar;  the Ayiri, who constitute the artisan caste; the Medas, who are basket and mat-weavers and act as drummers at feasts; the Binepatta, originally wandering musicians from Malabar, now farmers; and the Kavadi, cultivators settled in Yedenalknad (Virajpet). All these groups speak the Kodava language and conform generally to Kodava customs and dress.

Kodagu Aarebashe Gowda

Less frequent are Tulu speakers Billavas, Mogaveeras, Bunts, Goud Saraswat Brahmins.

The Arebhashe gowdas, or Kodagu Gowdas, and Tulu Gowdas, are an ethnic group of Dakshina Kannada and Kodagu. They live in Sulya (in Dakshina Kannada) and in parts of Somwarpet, Kushalanagar, Bhagamandala and Madikeri. They speak a language known as Arebhashe a dialect of Kannada. Guddemane Appaiah Gowda along with many other freedom fighters from different communities revolted against the British in an armed struggle which covered entire Kodagu and Dakshina Kannada. This was one of the earliest freedom movements against the British called "Amara Sulliada Swantantrya Sangraama" (Amara Sulya Dhange formally called the 'Coorg Rebellion' by the British) started in 1837.

Religion

Hindus are the vast majority. They include the Kodava tribe, other Kodava language speakers, Arebhashe Gowdas, Brahmins, most Yeravas and Kurubas.

A huge minority of Muslims dot the Coorg district, especially the towns of Kushalnagar, Virajpet and Mercara. A sizeable of them are the Nawayaths who shifted in the eighties from Bhatkal and Murdeshwar in order to pursue coffee & arecanut plantations and textile business. The numerous mosque dotting the landscape is the testimony of Muslim presence in the district.

A small number of Mangalorean Catholics are also found in Coorg. They are mostly descended from those Konkani Catholics who fled the roundup and, later, captivity by Tippu Sultan. These immigrants were welcomed by Raja Veerarajendra (himself a former captive of Tippu Sultan, having escaped six years of captivity in 1788) who realising their usefulness and expertise as agriculturists, gave them lands and tax breaks and built a church for them.

Tourism

Kodagu is rated as one of the top hill station destinations in India. Some of the most popular tourist attractions in Kodagu include Talakaveri, Bhagamandala, Nisargadhama, Abbey Falls, Dubare, Nagarahole National Park, Iruppu Falls, and the Tibetan Buddhist Golden Temple.

Talakaveri is the place where the River Kaveri originates. The temple on the riverbanks here is dedicated to Lord Brahma, and is one of only two temples dedicated to Brahma in India and Southeast Asia. Bhagamandala is situated at the Sangama (confluence) of two rivers, the Kaveri and the Kannika. A third river, the Sujyothi, is said to join from underground, and hence this spot is called the Triveni Sangama. Iruppu Falls is a sacred Kodagu Hindu spot in South Kodagu in the Brahmagiri hill range. The Lakshmana Tirtha River, with the waterfalls, flows nearby and has a Rameshwara temple on its banks. It is said that this sacred river was created when Laxmana, prince of Ayodhya and younger brother of Lord Rama, shot an arrow into nearby hill, the Brahmagiri hill. Chelavara falls and Thadiandamol peak are also in South Kodagu.  Nagarahole is a national park and wildlife resort.
Madikeri is the capital of the district and Raja's Seat park is popular with tourists. Kootu Poley dam is also popular among tourists. Omkareshwara Temple is a beautiful temple built in the Indo-Sarcenic style in Coorg. A legend is associated with the temple, built by Lingarajendra II in 1820 CE. The king put to death a pious Brahmin who dared to protest against his misdeeds. The spirit of the dead man began to plague the king day and night. On the advice of wise men, the king built this temple and installed a Shivalinga procured from Kashi, North India. St. Mark's Church is located within the Mercara Fort and was raised in 1859, by the officers and men of the East India Company. The building was funded by the Government of Madras, and placed under the Church of England in India, Diocese of Madras. The Church was closed after Indian independence, and taken over by the Government of Karnataka in 1971. The building now houses the Madikeri Fort Museum, managed by the Karnataka State Archaeological Department.
Dubare is mainly an elephant-capturing and training camp of the Forest Department at the edge of Dubare forest; on the bank of the river Kaveri along the Kushalanagara – Siddapura road. Nisargadhama is a man-made island and picnic spot near Kushalanagara, formed by the river Kaveri. The Tibetan Buddhist Golden Temple is at Bylakuppe near Kushalnagara (Mysore district), in the Tibetan refugee settlement.
Abbey Falls is a scenic waterfall 5 km from Madikeri. Mallalli falls is 25 km from Somawarapet, downhill of the Pushpagiri hills. Mandalapatti is 28 km from Madikeri. On the way to Abbey Falls, before 3 km from Abbey Falls take right, from there 25 km. Kote Betta temple, Kote Abbey falls are also in North Kodagu. Abbi waterfall and other waterfalls are best during monsoon season, typically some days after it starts raining in June up to the end of rainy season, while there is more water gushing in the streams and rivers.

Notable people

Armed Forces
 Field Marshal K. M. Cariappa, first Indian C-in-C, fourth Indian High Commissioner to Australia and New Zealand
 General Kodandera Subayya Thimayya, head of Indian Army, chairman of Korean Repatriation Commission, head of UN Peacekeeping force
 Squadron Leader Ajjamada Boppayya Devayya, martyred in Indo-Pak war of 1965 as a fighter pilot after shooting down enemy aircraft and crashing into Pakistan; only Indian Air Force personnel to earn the Mahavir Chakra posthumously 
 Mangerira Chinnappa Muthanna Army Martyr
 Lieutenant General Biddanda Chengappa Nanda, GOC-in-C Northern Command, Karnataka Rajyaotsava Awardee
 Lieutenant General  C.B. Ponnappa, Adjutant General of the Indian Army.
 Air MarshalK. C. Cariappa
 Lieutenant General Pattacheruvanda C. Thimayya, former General Officer in the Indian Army

Sports
 M. P. Ganesh (Mollera Poovaiah Ganesh), Indian hockey captain, player and coach
 B. P. Govinda (Billimoga Puttaswamy Govinda), Indian hockey player
 Arjun Halappa, Indian hockey captain and player
 A B Subbaiah (Anjaparavanda Bopaiah Subbaiah) - Indian field hockey goalkeeper and coach.
 M. M. Somaya (Maneyapanda Muthanna Somaya) - Indian field hockey player.
 S. V. Sunil (Somwarpet Vittalacharya Sunil), Indian hockey player
 V. R. Raghunath (Vokkaligara Ramachandra Raghunath), Indian hockey player
 Ashwini Nachappa, Indian athlete, Arjuna awardee
 Rohan Bopanna, Indian tennis player
 Ashwini Ponnappa, Indian badminton player
 Robin Uthappa, Indian Cricketer
 K. C. Cariappa, professional cricketer
 Jagat and Anita Nanjappa - motor racers
 Joshna Chinappa - Indian squash player 
 Len Aiyappa - Indian field hockey player.
 Neravanda Aiyappa - Cricketer

Politics
 C M Poonacha (Cheppudira Muthanna Poonacha) Gandhian, Freedom fighter, politician.
 N. Somanna (Nidyamale Somanna), lawyer and politician
 K. G. Bopaiah (Kombarana Ganapathy Bopaiah), 18th Speaker of the Karnataka Legislative Assembly
 Appachu Ranjan, politician
 Prema Cariappa, first woman Mayor of Bangalore, Rajya Sabha MP

Cinema
 Prema, actress
 Shwetha Chengappa, actress
 Rashmika Mandanna, actress
 Nidhi Subbaiah, actress
 Daisy Bopanna, actress
 Harshika Poonachha, actress
 Gulshan Devaiah

Civil Services
 C. B. Muthamma, first woman officer Indian Foreign Service
 Rao Bahadur Pemmanda K. Monnappa, first Inspector General of Police of Hyderabad State following Operation Polo
 (Tiger) Ashok Kumar, Retd. Assistant Commissioner of Police of Bengaluru
 A. S. Bopanna, Judge of Supreme court
 C. G. Somiah was the first IAS Officer from Coorg to rise to be the Home Secretary, Chief Vigilance Commissioner (CVC) and Comptroller and Auditor General.
Diwan Bahadur Ketoli Chengappa, administrator (Chief Commissioner of Coorg province)

Religion 
 Kalyatanda Ponnappa (c.1600) was a religious leader and warrior who is now worshipped as a demi-god
 Sadguru Appayya Swami (1885–1956), (born of Kodava parents) founder of Kaveri Ashram, a Hindu monastery in Virajpet, born as Palanganda Appaiah, ordained into Sannyas (monkhood) by Guru Ramgiri.
 Swami Narayanananda
 Swami Shambhavananda

Literature 
 Appachcha Kavi (also called Appachu Kavi), playwright
 Boverianda Nanjamma and Chinnappa, translators, authors 
 B D Ganapathy
 I. M. Muthanna author and translator
 Nadikerianda Chinnappa, folklore compiler

Others
 Kodagina Gowramma, noted writer
 Guddemane Appaiah Gowda, 19th century freedom fighter
Subedar Nerapanda Madaiah, Kodagu Freedom Movement 1835 - 1837
Subedar Mandira Uttaiah, Kodagu Freedom Movement 1835 - 1837
 Pandyanda Belliappa (also called Pandianda Belliappa or P I Belliappa) Gandhian, Freedom fighter, politician, journalist.
Biddu is a Kodava (Coorgi) by birth. He is a British Indian musician and winner of Grammy award. 
 Saleem Farook, tribal rights activist
 Nima Poovaya-Smith, museum curator, art historian and writer
N. S. Narendra, Firepro founder

See also
 Pushpagiri Wildlife Sanctuary

References

Further reading
 

 Belliappa, C. P. Tale of a Tiger's Tail & Others Yarns from Coorg. English.
 Belliappa, C. P. Victoria Gowramma. English.
 Bopanna, P. T. Kodagu: Mungaru Maleya Vismayada Nadu/ Discover Coorg. Kannada/ English.
 Bopanna, P. T. Coorg State: Udaya-Pathana / Coorg State. Kannada/ English.
 Ganapathy, B. D. Kodagu mattu Kodavaru. Kannada. 1962.
 Ganapathy, B. D. Nanga Kodava. Kodava. 1973.
 Kushalappa, Mookonda. “The early Coorgs”. Chennai: Notion Press. 2013.
 Kushalappa, Mookonda. “Long ago in Coorg”. Chennai: Pothi books. 2014.
 Murphy, Dervla. On a Shoestring to Coorg.
  Puttur Anantharaja Gowda (2015). IN PURSUIT OF OUR ROOTS Bengaluru: Tenkila Publications
 N Prabhakaran. Kutaku kurippukal (Coorg Notes). Kannur: Kairali Books.

External links

 
 Kodagu district website

 
Kodava Takk
Districts of Karnataka
Proposed states and union territories of India
Tourism in Karnataka